Muhammad Ali born 5 May 1983 is a Pakistani professional international Kabaddi player. He was member of the Pakistan national kabaddi team that won Asian bronze medals in 2010 in Guangzhou.

References

Living people
1983 births
Pakistani kabaddi players
Asian Games medalists in kabaddi
Kabaddi players at the 2010 Asian Games
Asian Games bronze medalists for Pakistan
Medalists at the 2010 Asian Games
21st-century Pakistani people